Parauta is a town and municipality in the province of Málaga, part of the autonomous community of Andalusia in southern Spain. It belongs to the comarca of Serranía de Ronda. It is situated in the west of the province in the Valle del Genal. The municipality is situated approximately 105 kilometres from the provincial capital of Málaga. It has a population of approximately 250 residents. The natives are called Parauteños.

References

Municipalities in the Province of Málaga